Aechmea manzanaresiana is a species of plant in the family Bromeliaceae. It is endemic to Ecuador.  Its natural habitat is subtropical or tropical moist montane forests. It is threatened by habitat loss.

Aechmea 'Fire' is a cultivar of the species.

References

manzanaresiana
Endemic flora of Ecuador
Endangered plants
Taxonomy articles created by Polbot